The men's 4 × 100 metres relay event at the 1975 Summer Universiade was held at the Stadio Olimpico in Rome on 20 and 21 September.

Results

Heats

Final

References

Athletics at the 1975 Summer Universiade
1975